Daniel Ginczek (born 13 April 1991) is a German professional footballer who plays as a forward for  club Fortuna Düsseldorf.

Club career

Borussia Dortmund
In the 2007–08 season, he was the best scorer in the U-17 league. In 25 games he scored 26 goals. In the U-18 national team, Ginczek scored three goals in six games, he also took part in seven matches of the U-19 national team, scoring on one occasion.

Since the 2008–09 season he was playing for the reserves of Borussia Dortmund. He made his debut in professional football on 28 July 2009 at a 0–0 draw against the reserve team of Eintracht Braunschweig.

In 2010, Ginczek was promoted to the Borussia Dortmund first team.

VfL Bochum loan spell
On 10 June 2011, Ginczek joined Bochum on loan until the end of the 2011–12 season. He scored his first goal in a 1–0 win over Frankfurt on 22 July 2011.

FC St. Pauli loan spell
In June 2012, Ginczek joined FC St. Pauli on loan until the end of the 2012–13 season. He scored his first goal in the 77th minute at a 3–0 away win over Offenburger FV in the DFB-Pokal, on 18 August 2012. He became a key player for the Hamburg side, scoring 18 goals in 31 matches.

1. FC Nürnberg
3 June 2013 saw the announcement of Ginczek having agreed to join Bundesliga side 1. FC Nürnberg for an undisclosed fee, signing a three-year contract.

VfB Stuttgart
For the 2014–15 season he moved to VfB Stuttgart. In May 2016 Ginczek extended his contract with Stuttgart until June 2020.

Fortuna Düsseldorf
On 29 January 2022, Ginczek signed with Fortuna Düsseldorf until 30 June 2024.

Personal life
Ginczek's paternal grandparents are from Poland.

Career statistics

References

External links
 
 Daniel Ginczek at Topforward

Living people
1991 births
German footballers
Association football forwards
Germany youth international footballers
Germany under-21 international footballers
VfB Stuttgart players
VfB Stuttgart II players
Borussia Dortmund II players
Borussia Dortmund players
1. FC Nürnberg players
1. FC Nürnberg II players
VfL Bochum players
FC St. Pauli players
VfL Wolfsburg players
Fortuna Düsseldorf players
Bundesliga players
2. Bundesliga players
3. Liga players
Regionalliga players
People from Arnsberg
Sportspeople from Arnsberg (region)
Footballers from North Rhine-Westphalia